The following is a timeline of the history of the city of Turin, Piedmont, Italy.

Prior to 17th century

 218 BC - Town besieged by forces led by Hannibal.
 27 BC - Romans establish Castra Taurinorum.
 69 AD - Fire caused by negligence of the 14th legion.
 312 - Battle of Turin.
 5th century - Roman Catholic diocese of Turin established.
 773 - Franks of Charlemagne in power.
 10th century - Monastery of St. Andrew established.
 940s - Contea di Torino (countship) founded.
 1354 -  founded.
 1404 - Palatine Towers rebuilt.
 1405 - University of Turin founded.
 1453 - City sacked.
 1474 - Printing press in operation.
 1498 - Turin Cathedral built.
 1515 - Roman Catholic Archdiocese of Turin established.
 1536 - French in power.
 1563 - City becomes capital of the Duchy of Savoy.
 1565 - Citadel built.
 1568 - Collegio dei Nobili founded.
 1583 - Capuchin monastery founded on Monte dei Cappuccini.

17th century

 1610 - Church of Corpus Domini and  built.
 1630 - Plague.
 1638 - Piazza San Carlo laid out.
 1640 - Siege of Turin; French in power.
 1652 - Accademia Albertina di Belle Arti founded.
 1656 - Monte dei Cappuccini church built.
 1658 - Royal Palace built.
 1659 - Artillery Arsenal founded.
 1660 - Castello del Valentino built.
 1669 - Palazzo de Citta (town hall) built.
 1679 - Jesuit college built.
 1680 - Palazzo Carignano built.
 1687 - Church of San Lorenzo built.
 1694 - Sindone Chapel built.

18th century
 1706 - City besieged by French forces.
 1718 - Palazzo Madama expanded.
 1720
 City becomes capital of the Kingdom of Sardinia.
 University Library founded.
 1730 -  built.
 1731 - Orto Botanico dell'Università di Torino (garden) laid out.
 1736 -  built.
 1740 - Royal Theatre opens.
 1753 - Teatro Carignano opens.
 1757 - Academy of sciences founded.
 1760 - Reycends publisher in business (approximate date).
 1763 - Caffè Al Bicerin in business.
 1772 - Church of San Filippo Neri built.
 1780 - Caffè Fiorio in business.
 1784 - Patriottica Nobile Societa del Casino formed.
 1785 - Società Agraria di Torino founded.
 1798 - French in power.

19th century

 1801 - Fortifications demolished.
 1802 - City becomes part of French Empire.
 1814 - City becomes capital of Kingdom of Piedmont-Sardinia.
 1815 - Accademia Filarmonica founded.
 1823 - Population: 88,000.
 1824 - Museo Egizio (Egyptian museum) founded.
 1831 - Gran Madre di Dio, Turin (church) built.
 1832 - Pinacoteca opens in Palazzo Madama.
 1837 - Royal Library of Turin and Royal Armoury established.
 1841 - Società del Whist founded.
 1843 -  founded.
 1848
 Gazzetta del Popolo begins publication.
  becomes mayor.
 1857 - Fortifications demolished.
 1861
 City becomes capital of newly united Kingdom of Italy.
 Population: 173,305.
 1862 - Regio Museo Industriale Italiano (industrial museum) established.
 1863 - Club Alpino Italiano founded.
 1864 - Torino Porta Nuova railway station opens.
 1865 - Capital of Kingdom of Italy relocates from Turin to Florence.
 1867 - Gazzetta Piemontese newspaper begins publication.
 1868 -  and Torino Porta Susa railway station built.
 1869
 22 February: Biblioteca Civica Centrale (Turin) (library) opens.
 Le Nuove prison built.
 1871
 Fréjus Rail Tunnel opens.
 Population: 207,770.
 1878 - Museum of the Risorgimento established.
 1879 - Mont Cenis Tunnel Monument erected in Piazza Statuto.
 1889 - Mole Antonelliana built.
 1892 -  (hiking club) formed.
 1896 - 1 February: Premiere of Puccini's opera La Bohème.
 1897
 Sport Club Juventus formed.
 Population: 351,855.
 1899 - F.I.A.T. automotive manufactory in business.

20th century

 1902 - International Exposition of Modern Decorative Arts held.
 1906
 Lancia & C. automotive manufactory in business.
 Royal Turin Polytechnic and Torino Football Club founded.
 Population: 361,720.
 1907 - Derby della Mole athletic contest begins.
 1908 - September, first solo aeroplane flight by a woman, Thérèse Peltier, from the Military Square, Turin
 1911
 Turin International world's fair held.
 Population: 415,667.
 1922 - Conflict between Fascist and labour supporters.
 1933
 Giulio Einaudi editore (publisher) in business.
 Stadio Benito Mussolini opens.
 1934 - City Museum of Ancient Art housed in the Palazzo Madama.
 1937 -  constructed.
 1945
 Allies take city.
 Tuttosport begins publication.
 1949
 May 4: Superga air disaster.
 Torino Esposizioni built.
 1951 - Population: 719,300.
 1953 - Turin Airport built.
 1958 - Politecnico di Torino building constructed.
 1960 - Museo Nazionale dell'Automobile opens.
 1961 - Population: 1,025,822.
 1971 - Population: 1,167,968.
 1982 - Festival Internazionale Cinema Giovani begins.
 1983 - February 13: Cinema Statuto fire.
 1988 - Salone del Libro (book fair) begins.
 1990 - Stadio delle Alpi opens.
 1992 -  (orchestra) formed.

21st century

 2001 - Sergio Chiamparino becomes mayor.
 2002 - Lumiq Studios established.
 2003 - Gruppo Torinese Trasporti founded.
 2004
 Terra Madre conference begins.
 ESCP Europe campus established.
 2006
 Turin Metro begins operating.
 2006 Winter Olympics held.
 Archaeological Park opens.
 City named World Book Capital by UNESCO.
 2007 - Eataly in business.
 2008 - National Museum of Cinema and Museum of Oriental Art established.
 2010 - ToBike municipal bike-sharing program begins.
 2011
 Juventus Stadium opens.
 Piero Fassino becomes mayor.
 2012 - Population: 906,089.
 2016 - June: Turin municipal election, 2016 held.

See also
 List of mayors of Turin
 
  (state archives)

Timelines of other cities in the macroregion of Northwest Italy:(it)
 Liguria region: Timeline of Genoa
 Lombardy region: Timeline of Bergamo; Brescia; Cremona; Mantua; Milan; Pavia
 Piedmont region: Timeline of Novara

References

This article incorporates information from the German Wikipedia and the Italian Wikipedia.

Bibliography

in English
published in the 18th-19th century
 
 
 
 
 
 
 
 
 
 
 
 

published in the 20th-21st century
 
 
  + 1870 ed.

in other languages

 
 
 . v.1, v.2
 
 
 
 
 
 
 . v.1
 Boccalatte et al., eds. Torino in guerra: 1940-1945 (Turin: Gribaudo, 1995)
 Bruno Maida, ed. Guerra e società nella provincia di Torino, 1940-1945 (Turin: Blu Edizioni, 2007)

External links

 Europeana. Items related to Turin, various dates.

 
Turin
Cities and towns in Piedmont